Emmanuel Nwafor Otteh (1  November 1927 – 27 July 2012) was a Nigerian Roman Catholic prelate.

Otteh was born in Nigeria and was ordained to the priesthood in 1961. He served as titular bishop of Cova and as the auxiliary bishop of the Roman Catholic Diocese of Onitsha, Nigeria, from 1990 to 1997 and as bishop of the Roman Catholic Diocese of Issele-Uku, Nigeria, from 1997 until his retirement in 2003.

Notes

1927 births
2012 deaths
Roman Catholic bishops of Issele-Uku
20th-century Roman Catholic bishops in Nigeria
21st-century Roman Catholic bishops in Nigeria